Franciska is a given name. It is a feminine form of the Latin Franciscus. Notable people with the name include:

 Franciska Clausen (1899–1986), Danish painter
 Franciska Farkas (born 1984), Hungarian actress
 Franciska Gaal (1903–1973), Hungarian cabaret artist and film actress
 Franciska Grassalkovich (1732–1779), Hungarian noblewoman
 Franciska Győry (born 1940), Hungarian actress
 Franciska Jansen, Dutch track and field athlete
 Franciska Königsegg-Aulendorfi, German noblewoman
 Franciska Nagy (born 1943), Hungarian writer
 Franciska Sontag (1789–1866), stage actor
 Franciska Töröcsik (born 1990), Hungarian actress

See also 
 Franziska (given name)
 Francis (given name)

References

Hungarian feminine given names